Ulrich Stephan (born May 7, 1970) is a German ICCF Grandmaster.

Biography
From 1987 to 2005 he participated in various tournaments in Germany, including the chess Bundesliga. Later his main focus switched to correspondence chess. In 2010 he won the 23rd World Correspondence Chess Championship  (2007–2010).

References

External links
 
 
 

1970 births
Living people
World Correspondence Chess Champions
Correspondence chess grandmasters
German chess players